Santo Cristo is a neighborhood in Rio de Janeiro, Brazil. The neighbourhood is named after the Catholic church Santo Cristo dos Milagres ("Holy Christ of Miracles") situated in the port area.

References

Neighbourhoods in Rio de Janeiro (city)